"Just Between You and Me" is a single by American singer Lou Gramm from his second solo album Long Hard Look, released in 1989 (see 1989 in music). It was a No.6 hit in the United States and peaked at No.2 in Canada.

Charts

Weekly charts

Year-end charts

References

1989 singles
Songs written by Holly Knight
Atlantic Records singles
Songs written by Lou Gramm
1989 songs